The 2017–18 season was Sheffield United's 129th season in their history and marked their return to the Championship, following a six-year stay in the third tier. Along with the Championship, the club also competed in the FA Cup and EFL Cup.

Before the season, many EFL fans, Sheffield Wednesday fans amongst them, tipped the Blades for a season of struggles in and around the bottom 3. United defied this by finishing 10th, and chasing the play-offs all season long.

The season covered the period from 1 July 2017 to 30 June 2018.

Squad

 All appearances and goals up to date as of 10 February 2018.

Statistics

|-
!colspan=14|Player(s) out on loan:

|-
!colspan=14|Player(s) who left the club:

|}

Goals

Disciplinary record

Contracts

Transfers

Transfers in

Transfers out

Loans in

Loans out

Pre-season

Friendlies
As of 16 June 2017, Sheffield United have six pre-season friendlies against Stoke City, Stocksbridge Park Steels, Chesterfield, Rotherham United, Eastleigh and Málaga.

Competitions

EFL Championship

League table

Result summary

Results by matchday

Matches
On 21 June 2017, the EFL Championship league fixtures were announced.

FA Cup
In the FA Cup, Sheffield United entered the competition in the third round and were drawn away to Ipswich Town.

EFL Cup
On 16 June 2017, Sheffield United were drawn at home to Walsall in the first round. A home tie was to follow in the second round, with Leicester City the visitors.

References

Sheffield United F.C. seasons
Sheffield United